Afghan nationalism, or pan-Afghanism, is the belief or assertion that the Afghan people are a nation. Afghan nationalists promote the cultural integration of all the people living in Afghanistan. The concept of Afghan nationalism politically overlaps with Pashtun nationalism, as the latter favour the ideas of a "Greater Afghanistan" (i.e. it claims the Pashtun-speaking parts of Pakistan for Afghanistan). However, Afghan nationalists do not always demand for the Pashtun-speaking parts of Pakistan.

History 
It has been argued that Afghan nationalism has its roots from the years 1901-1929. Much of Afghanistan's nationalism is rooted in postcolonialism with it arising following the independence of the Emirate of Afghanistan from the British Empire in 1919 after the Third Anglo-Afghan War. Afghan nationalism has also been described as a cause of the Soviet–Afghan War due to the Afghan mujahideen fighting against what they called 'Soviet neocolonialism'. Afghan nationalism has also been associated with the Taliban. In the Islamic Republic of Afghanistan, Afghan nationalism or Afghan patriotism was described as incredibly weak. Pakistan has also played a role in keeping Afghan nationalism down to prevent "Greater Afghanistan" from becoming a reality. The Saqqawists were also considered to be Afghan nationalists, though they were more of Tajik nationalists.

Afghan nationalism became increasingly prominent in the late 1980s under Mohammed Najibullah. The ideology of the ruling party had gradually changed to one seeking pan-Afghan unity against what was called the threat posed by Pakistan.

Following the 2021 Taliban offensive and subsequent take-over of Afghanistan in 2021, many in the Afghan diaspora, primarily non-Pashtun members began reassessing Afghan nationalism and the overlaps it has with Pashtun nationalism, this combined with the widely documented historical and current Persecution of Hazaras by the Taliban and various Pashtun-led governments has led to many outright rejecting the Afghan national identity mirroring earlier events such as the ID card (e-Tazkira) controversy. The Taliban regime's unlawful detainment and torture of civilians in Panjshir Province as part of crackdowns on the opposing National Resistance Front of Afghanistan has further inflamed such debates and ethnic tensions in the diaspora. This has led to much controversy between Pashtun Afghans and non-Pashtun Afghans leading to the re-emergence of Hazara nationalism and other forms of nationalistic sentiment amongst non-Pashtun members of the diaspora much to the dislike of Pashtun nationalists and Afghan nationalists in the Afghan diaspora.

Beliefs 
Afghan nationalists have, at least historically, attempted to build an Afghan national identity as a united Afghan people with a common culture and history. Afghan nationalists tend to have right-wing conservative positions like those of the Islamic Movement of Taliban.

References

Afghan nationalism
Political ideologies
Modern history of Afghanistan
Political history of Afghanistan